Pieris angelika (Arctic white) is a cold-climate butterfly of the family Pieridae. Its main range is in north-western Canada (Yukon, Northwest Territories, north-western British Columbia) and Alaska. Its taxonomic name may change in the future, because it was previously described and named before 1983.

Features
Adult butterflies have an average wingspan of 33 to 42mm.

Viewed from above, males are mostly white, with a thin black line in the costa and margin. Black shading can also be seen on the wings. The underside of the males can be a pale yellow, and are often seen with dark green veins. 

Females can be white or yellow and often exhibit dark scaling and patches along the veins.

References

angelica
Butterflies described in 1983
Insects of the Arctic